South Shore—St. Margarets (formerly South Shore—St. Margaret's and South Shore) is a federal electoral district in Nova Scotia, Canada, that has been represented in the House of Commons of Canada since 1968. It covers the South Shore region of Nova Scotia.

Demographics

From the 2006 census 

Ethnic groups:
White: 97.1%
First Nations: 1.5%
Black: 0.6%

Languages:
English: 96.9%
French: 1.2%
German: 0.6%
Other: 1.1%

Religions:
Protestant: 71.5%
Catholic: 11.5%
Other Christian: 1.1%
No affiliation: 15.4%

Education:
No certificate, diploma or degree: 34.5%
High school certificate: 21.2%
Apprenticeship or trade certificate or diploma: 12.2%
Community college, CEGEP or other non-university certificate or diploma: 17.4%
University certificate or diploma: 14.7%

Median Age:
45.2

Median total income:
$20,580

Average total income:
$27,987

Median household income:
$44,108

Average household income:
$53,111

Median family income:
$52,772

Average family income:
$61,279

Unemployment:
10.3%

Geography

It consists of:
 the counties of Shelburne, Queens and Lunenburg;
and
 the western part of the Halifax Regional Municipality, i.e., the part lying west of a line drawn south from the intersection of the boundary between the regional municipality and the County of Hants with the western shoreline of Pockwock Lake along the shoreline to the  western extremity of Ponhook Cove, then south in a straight line for approximately 2.7 km to the mouth of the Pockwock River at Wrights Lake, southeast in a straight line for approximately 3.8 km to the northern extremity of Stillwater Lake, south along that lake, southwest along Route 213 (Hammonds Plains Road) to Trunk 3, southeast in a straight line for approximately 18.6 km to the mouth of the Nine Mile River, southwest along Shad Bay (passing west of Cochrans Island) to the Atlantic Ocean.

History
It was created in 1966 mostly from Queens—Lunenburg and Shelburne—Yarmouth—Clare. In 2003, the district added portions of Halifax West.

After the 2012 federal electoral redistribution, the riding gained 11% of its new territory from Halifax West.

Members of Parliament

This riding has elected the following Members of Parliament:

Election results

South Shore—St. Margarets

2021 general election

2019 general election

2015 general election

South Shore—St. Margaret's

2011 general election

2008 general election

2006 general election

2004 general election

South Shore

2000 general election

1997 general election

1993 general election

1988 general election

1984 general election

1980 general election

1979 general election

1974 general election

1972 general election

1968 general election

See also
 List of Canadian federal electoral districts
 Past Canadian electoral districts

References

 Riding history for South Shore–St. Margaret's (2003– ) from the Library of Parliament
Campaign expenses from Elections Canada website

Notes

External links
Candidate info from their own or the political parties websites:
 Gordon Earle (NDP)
 Gerald Keddy (Conservative)
 Joseph Larkin (Christian Heritage)
 Michael Oddy (Green Party)
 Dr. Bill Smith (Liberal)

Nova Scotia federal electoral districts
Bridgewater, Nova Scotia
Politics of Halifax, Nova Scotia
Region of Queens Municipality
Shelburne County, Nova Scotia